Parliamentary elections were held in Norway on 12 and 13 September 1993. It was the first European election where the two largest parties fielded a female leadership candidate, and the first election in history where all the largest three parties fielded female leadership candidates. The Labour Party remained the largest party in the Storting, winning 67 of the 165 seats.

Voter turnout was 76% , the lowest in a national election since the 1927 elections. The prospect of European Union membership was a key issue in the election campaign.

Results

Seat distribution

Notes

References

1993
1993
Norway
1993 in Norway
September 1993 events in Europe